Mammamattawa is a dispersed rural community and unincorporated place in the Unorganized North Part of Cochrane District in northeastern Ontario, Canada.

The Constance Lake First Nation operates a camp at Mammamattawa.

History
The first inland post of the Hudson's Bay Company, named Henley House, was established at the confluence of the Kenogami River and Albany River in 1743. A new post was established in 1884 at the confluence of the Kenogami River and the Kabinakagami River. It was known as the English River Post, as the Kenogami was also known as the English River. The English River First Nation, the primary forerunner to today's Constance Lake First Nation, had a reserve set aside for their use just north of the post in 1912, which remains part of the Constance Lake First Nations lands as English River 66 Indian Reserve. The Hudson's Bay Company English River Post was abandoned in 1941, and the place later took on its present First Nations name.

References

Communities in Cochrane District